Homeobox protein CDX-1 is a protein in humans that is encoded by the CDX1 gene. CDX1 is expressed in the developing endoderm and its expression persists in the intestine throughout adulthood. CDX1 protein expression varies along the intestine, with high expression in intestinal crypts and diminishing expression along intestinal villi.

Function 

This gene is a member of the caudal-related homeobox transcription factor family. The encoded DNA-binding protein regulates intestine-specific gene expression and enterocyte differentiation. It has been shown to induce expression of the intestinal alkaline phosphatase gene, and inhibit beta-catenin/T-cell factor transcriptional activity.

CDX1 has also been shown to play an important role in embryonic epicardial development. It has been demonstrated that CDX proteins suppress cardiac differentiation in both zebrafish and mouse embryonic stem cells, but the overall mechanism for how this happens is poorly understood. However, CDX1 has been shown to be transiently expressed in the embryonic heart 11.5 days post coitum (dpc). This transient expression is thought to induce epicardial epithelial-to-mesynchemal transition and thus proper cardiovascular formation. It has been shown that low-dose CDX1 induction caused enhanced migration and differentiation of epicardium-derived cells into vascular smooth muscle, where as continued high dose induction of CDX1 or CDX1 deficiency diminished the ability of these cells to migrate and differentiate into smooth muscle by the actions of TGF-β1. Furthermore, CDX1 induction also altered transcript expression of genes related to cell adhesions for EMT and angiogenesis. Therefore, along with its known roles in intestinal patterning and differentiation, CDX1 is also shown to be important in epicardial development.

References

Further reading

External links 
 
 

Transcription factors